Choromytilus chorus, common name Chorus mussel or Choro mussel, is a species of mussel, a marine bivalve mollusc in the family Mytilidae.

Description
Shells of Choromytilus chorus can reach a length of 18 cm (7 inches) and a height of 9 cm (3.5 inches).

Distribution
This species is present in Peru and in Chile.

References

 Huber, M. (2010). Compendium of bivalves. A full-color guide to 3,300 of the world’s marine bivalves. A status on Bivalvia after 250 years of research. Hackenheim: ConchBooks. 901 pp.
 Toro, B.; Navarro, J.M.; Palma-Fleming, H. (2003). Relationship between bioenergetics responses and organic pollutants in the giant mussel, Choromytilus chorus (Mollusca: Mytilidae) Aquat. Toxicol. 63(3): 257-269

Mytilidae
Molluscs described in 1782